IFTM University (Institute of Foreign Trade and Management) is a university located in Moradabad, Uttar Pradesh, India.
IFTM University was granted university status by UP government vide IFTM University Act No. 24 of 2010. It has expanded into a  campus offering courses in various disciplines and programmes.

IFTM University offers more than 70 programs of diploma, undergraduate, postgraduate and doctoral level in engineering, business management, pharmacy, biotechnology, microbiology, arts, sciences, law, education, Journalism and mass communication, social science, computer application, etc. School of Biotechnology (SBT) offers lectures, laboratory-based exercises with linked discussions, Journal Clubs and Experimental Design sessions.

References

External links

Private universities in Uttar Pradesh
Education in Moradabad
Educational institutions established in 2013
2013 establishments in Uttar Pradesh